The Sukhoi Su-34 (NATO reporting name: Fullback) is a Soviet-origin Russian twin-engine, twin-seat, all-weather supersonic medium-range fighter-bomber/strike aircraft. It first flew in 1990, intended for the Soviet Air Forces, and it entered service in 2014 with the Russian Air Force.

Based on the Sukhoi Su-27 Flanker air superiority fighter, the Su-34 has an armoured cockpit with side-by-side seating for its two pilots. The Su-34 is designed primarily for tactical deployment against ground and naval targets (tactical bombing/attack/interdiction roles, including against small and mobile targets) on solo and group missions in daytime and at night, under favourable and adverse weather conditions and in a hostile environment with counter-fire and electronic warfare (EW) counter-measures deployed, as well as for aerial reconnaissance. The Su-34 is planned to eventually replace the Su-24 tactical strike fighter and the Tu-22M long-distance bomber.

Development
The Su-34 had a murky and protracted beginning. In the mid-1980s, Sukhoi began developing a new tactical multirole combat aircraft to replace the swing-wing Su-24, which would incorporate a host of conflicting requirements. The bureau thus selected the Su-27, which excelled in maneuverability and range, and could carry a large payload, as the basis for the new fighter-bomber. The development, known internally as T-10V, was shelved at the end of the 1980s sharing the fate of the aircraft carrier Ulyanovsk; this was the result of the political upheaval in the Soviet Union and its subsequent disintegration.

In August 1990, a photograph taken by a TASS officer showed an aircraft making a dummy approach towards the aircraft carrier Tbilisi. The aircraft, subsequently and erroneously labelled Su-27KU by Western intelligence, made its maiden flight on 13 April 1990 with Anatoliy Ivanov at the controls. Converted from an Su-27UB with the new distinctive nose, while retaining the main undercarriage of previous Su-27s, it was a prototype for the Su-27IB (IB stands for istrebitel-bombardirovshchik, or "fighter bomber"). It was developed in parallel with the two-seat naval trainer, the Su-27KUB.  However, contrary to earlier reports, the two aircraft are not directly related. Flight tests continued throughout 1990 and into 1991.

In 1992, the Su-27IB was displayed to the public at the MosAeroshow (later renamed "MAKS Airshow"), where it demonstrated aerial refuelling with an Il-78, and performed an aerobatic display. The aircraft was officially unveiled on 13 February 1992 at Machulishi, where Russian President Boris Yeltsin and the CIS leaders were holding a summit. The following year the Su-27IB was again displayed at the MAKS Airshow.

The next prototype, and first pre-production aircraft, T10V-2, first flew on 18 December 1993, with Igor Votintsev and Yevgeniy Revoonov at the controls. Built at Novosibirsk, where Su-24s were constructed, this aircraft was visibly different from the original prototype; it had modified vertical stabilizers, twin tandem main undercarriage and a longer "stinger", which houses an N012 rearward-facing warning radar, plus the drogue chute and as well as fuel jettison outlet.

The first aircraft built to production standard made its maiden flight on 28 December 1994. It was fitted with a fire-control system, at the heart of which was the Leninets OKB-designed V004 passive electronically scanned array radar. It was different enough from the earlier versions that it was re-designated the "Su-34". However, at the 1995 Paris Air Show, the aircraft was allocated the "Su-32FN" designation, signalling the aircraft's potential role as a shore-based naval aircraft for the Russian Naval Aviation. Sukhoi also promoted the Su-34 as the "Su-32MF" (MnogoFunksionalniy, "multi-function").

Budget restrictions caused the programme to stall repeatedly. Nevertheless, flight testing continued, albeit at a slow pace. The third pre-production aircraft first flew in late 1996.

Russia's Ministry of Defence plans to modernize the Su-34; according to the deputy head of the military department, Yuriy Borisov, "We are planning to modernize the aircraft: prolong its service life, increase the number of airborne weapons. Plane is in great demand in our armed forces, and it has a great future."

Russia is developing two new versions of the aircraft: one for electronic warfare (L700 Tarantul ECM pod can provide electronic cover for a group of aircraft) and one for Intelligence, surveillance, and reconnaissance.

Su-34M modernised version will feature a new electro-optical infrared targeting pod, a Kopyo-DL rearward facing radar that can warn the pilots if missiles are approaching, combined with automatic deployment of countermeasures and jamming.

Orders and deliveries 
An initial batch of eight aircraft was completed by the Novosibirsk factory in 2004. In March 2006, Russian Minister of Defence Sergei Ivanov announced the purchase of the first five pre-production Su-34s for the Russian Air Force. In late 2008, a second contract was signed for delivery of 32 aircraft by 2015. A total of 70 aircraft were to be purchased by 2015 to replace some 300 Su-24s in service at the time, which were then undergoing a modernization program. Ivanov claimed that as it is "many times more effective on all critical parameters", fewer of these newer bombers are required than the old Su-24 it replaces. In December 2006, Ivanov stated that approximately 200 Su-34s were expected to be in service by 2020. This was confirmed by Air Force chief Vladimir Mikhaylov on 6 March 2007. Two Su-34s were delivered in 2006–2007, and three more were delivered by the end of 2009.

On 9 January 2008, Sukhoi reported that the Su-34 had begun full-rate production. The final stage of the state tests were completed on 19 September 2011.

The Russian Air Force received another four Su-34s on 28 December 2010, as combat units in airbases first received six Su-34s in 2011. Delivery came in the form of two contracts, the first in 2008 for 32 aircraft and the second in 2012 for a further 92 aircraft, totaling 124 to be delivered by 2020.

In December 2012, Sukhoi reportedly delivered five aircraft under the 2012 State Defence Order.

On 6 May 2013, the first Su-34s under the 2013 defence procurement plan were delivered. On 9 July 2013, three more Su-34s were delivered in an official acceptance ceremony held at the Novosibirsk Aircraft Plant. By the end of 2013, Sukhoi completed the 2008 contract and started deliveries of aircraft under the 2012 contract.

In August 2013, Sukhoi ordered 184 Identification friend or foe transponders for the Russian Su-34s from the Kazan-based Radiopribor holding company, to be delivered by 2020.

On 10 June 2014, a further delivery of Su-34s was made to the 559th Bomber Aviation Regiment at Morozovsk Air Base. Another three aircraft were delivered on 18 July 2014. In total, 18 aircraft were delivered in 2014, with 20 planned to be delivered in 2015.

Sukhoi delivered the first batch of Su-34s under the 2015 defence procurement plan on 21 May 2015. On 16 July 2015, the Sukhoi Company handed over another batch of Su-34 frontline bombers to the Russian Defence Ministry. The transfer took place in the framework of the Unified Military Hardware Acceptance Day in the Novosibirsk Aircraft Production Association Plant.

After eight years of negotiations, Rosoboronexport received official request to supply the Su-34 to the Algerian Air Force.

The last two Su-34s of the 2012 contract were delivered to the 968th Fighter Aviation Regiment at the Lipetsk Air Base in December 2020. This brought the total number of operational aircraft delivered to the Russian Air Force to 131 (not counting crashes and aircraft written off). Apart from this, also seven pre-production units were built under previous contracts.

On 25 August 2020, the Russian Defence Ministry signed a third contract for a further 24 Su-34 aircraft for the Russian Air Force. The deliveries will stretch over three years. By December 2021, the Russian Air Force received six new aircraft of the third order.

In June 2022, the Russian Air Force received another four aircraft of the third order. These were the first aircraft built under the new "Su-34M" standard. They became part of the 277th Bomber Aviation Regiment.

In August 2022, the Russian Ministry of Defence signed a new contract for supply of Su-34 bombers.

In November 2022, Russia received a new batch of Sukhoi Su-34s of the modernized Su-34M variant; the number is yet unknown but it is safe to assume it was at least four units. Another batch of modernized Su-34Ms was handed over to the Russian Air Force in late December 2022. At this point, the total number of Su-34s produced under all contracts, including seven prototypes and pre-production units, reached at least 153 units.

Design

The Su-34 shares most of its wing structure, tail, and engine nacelles with the Su-27/Su-30, with canards like the Su-30MKI, Su-33, and Su-27M/35 to increase static instability (higher manoeuvrability) and to reduce trim drag.

The Su-34 is powered by a pair of Saturn AL-31FM1 turbofan engines, the same engines used on the Su-27SM, giving the aircraft a maximum speed of Mach 1.8+ when fully loaded. Although slower than the standard Su-27, the Su-34 can still handle high G-loads and perform aerobatic maneuvers. The airframe is cleared to perform maneuvers of up to +9 g. The noise level of the Su-34 is two times lower than the level of its predecessors.

The Su-34 is a three lifting surface design having both a conventional horizontal tailplane at the rear and a canard foreplane in front of the main wings. The foreplane provides both additional lift (force) and greater maneuverability. It has twin tail fins like those of Su-27 from which it is derived. It retains the 30 mm GSh-30-1 cannon of the Su-27 and Su-30, and the ability to carry six R-77 or R-73 air-to-air missiles, with these being primarily for defense against pursuers if detected by the rearward facing radar. A Khibiny electronic countermeasures (ECM) system is fitted as standard.

Compared to other members of the Flanker family, the Su-34 has an entirely new "Duckbill" nose and forward fuselage designed to increase cabin room and maximize crew comfort and safety, giving the Su-34 the nickname ‘Hellduck’ or ‘Platypus’. The two pilots sit side-by-side in NPP Zvezda K-36dm ejection seats: the pilot-commander on the left with the navigator and weapon operator on the right. An advantage of the side by side cockpit is that duplicate instruments are not required for each pilot. Since long missions require comfort, the pressurization system allows operation up to  without oxygen masks, which are available for emergencies and combat situations.

The crew members have room to stand and move about the cabin during long missions. The space between the seats allows them to lie down, if necessary. A hand-held urinal "toilet" and vacuum flask "kitchen" are provided. A ladder attached to the nose landing gear and a hatch in the cockpit floor is used to enter the cockpit. The cockpit is a continuous capsule of armour (17 mm).

The multifunctional Leninets V-004 main radar has terrain-following and terrain avoidance modes. Maximum detection range for the passive electronically scanned array forward radar is  against large surface targets, to cover the rear a second aft-facing radar is mounted. The main radar can simultaneously track ten air targets and attack four targets (in the air, on land or on the water). The radius of detection for fighter-sized targets is up to 120 km, the range of the survey is +/- 60 degrees. The rear warning radar system can warn of attack from behind and allow it to fire its R-73 missiles against pursuers without needing to turn the aircraft. The rear radar is from Phazotron/Rassvet, and is unofficially called the N-012. The Su-34 reportedly has a frontal radar cross-section that is an order of magnitude smaller than prior generation fighters.

A new 4th generation radar Pika-M of the complex BKR-3, having a range up to 300 km, passed state tests in 2016. As of 2021, several aircraft of the RuAF have passed modernization with special equipment that increases capabilities in detecting air and ground targets and expand the types of weapons used.

Operational history

Russia

The Su-34 is rumoured to have made its combat debut during the 2008 Russo-Georgian War.

In July 2010, several Su-34s and Su-24Ms conducted a  non-stop flight from air bases in European Russia to the Russian Far East. The exercise included aircraft carrying weapons at full load and simulated delivering them on targets, demonstrating the Su-34's long-range capability. The Su-24Ms were refuelled three times, while the Su-34s were refuelled twice.

The final stage of the Su-34's state trials was completed on 19 September 2011 and the aircraft entered service in early 2014. Russia plans to have 124 aircraft in use by 2020. It is planned to increase to 200 aircraft later.

On 4 June 2015, an Su-34 slid off the runway and flipped over when its parachute failed to open after landing. Nobody was injured. The aircraft was returning from a routine training mission in Russia's Voronezh region. In June 2016, the damaged aircraft was transferred on board an Antonov An-124 to the Novosibirsk Aircraft Production Association plant for repairs, and was likely returned to service the same year.

On 18 January 2019, two Su-34s collided mid-air in Russia's Far East region, while performing a scheduled training flight. Two pilots were killed, one was rescued and one remained missing. All Su-34 flights were suspended throughout Russia following the accident.

On 6 September 2019, two Su-34s again collided mid-air, this time in the western Russian city of Lipetsk. According to a Russian source the collision happened due to pilot error. Both pilots managed to land after the accident.

On 21 October 2020, an Su-34 crashed performing a training flight in Khabarovsk region.

On 17 October 2022, an Su-34 crashed into the courtyard of a residential apartment complex in Yeysk during a training flight, setting two blocks on fire. At least 13 people were killed and 19 were treated in hospital. Locals were seen rescuing one of the pilots and a school was evacuated. Russian defense ministry sources stated the cause of the crash was an engine fire on take off and that both pilots ejected safely.  Russian naval aviation uses Yeysk as a main training area.

2015 Russian military intervention in Syria

In September 2015, six Su-34s arrived at Latakia airport in Syria, for attacks against rebel and ISIL forces. Russian air attacks in Syria started on 30 September, in the Homs region. On 1 October, the Su-34 was used to bomb Islamic State targets in Syria. The Russian Air Force Su-34 fighter-bombers destroyed an Islamic State command center and training camp south-west of the city of Raqqa. These included precision strikes from an altitude of over 5,000 m (16,400 ft).

Russian Su-34 and Su-25 attack aircraft carried out air strikes the next day against Islamic State targets in Syria's Hama province using precision bombs. According to Russian Defense Ministry spokesman Maj. Gen. Igor Konashenkov, Su-34s hit an ISIL fortified bunker in the Hama province with guided bombs. Fortifications, ammunition depots, seven units of the military equipment near Syria's Maarrat al-Numan were also destroyed by the Russian Air Force. An ISIL command center and underground depot were also destroyed with explosives near Raqqa. 

Defense Ministry spokesman, Maj. Gen. Igor Konashenkov, said in a statement on 3 October: "Accurate delivery of a concrete-piercing bomb BETAB-500 launched from a Su-34 aircraft near Raqqa destroyed a hardened command centre of one of the illegal armed groups as well as an underground bunker with explosives and ammunition depot." A Russian Air Force representative stated Su-34s acquire targets using the GLONASS satellite system for bombing. During this time six Su-34s were in Syria.

Following the downing of a Su-24 by Turkey, Russia announced on 30 November 2015 that Su-34s in Syria had begun flying combat missions while armed with air-to-air missiles. On 16 August 2016, Tu-22M3 long-range bombers and Su-34 bombers, having taken off from their base in Hamadan Islamic Republic of Iran, carried out group airstrikes against targets belonging to ISIS and Jabhat al-Nusra terrorist groups in the provinces of Aleppo, Deir ez-Zor and Idlib.

On 3 October 2017, Russian Su-34s and Su-35s were deployed to strike "the place of the Al-Nusra leadership meeting" whose location was discovered by Russian military intelligence in Syria subsequently eliminating 12 Al-Nusra field commanders and some 50 militants of the group including Ahmad al-Ghizai, Al-Nusra's security chief according to the Russian Defense Ministry.

On 28 May 2018, it was reported that Russian Su-34s intercepted two Israeli Air Force F-16s over Tripoli, Lebanon, forcing them to retreat.

On 27 February 2020, two Russian Su-34s allegedly carried out an airstrike on a Turkish military convoy killing up to 36 soldiers and injuring at least 60 more in Balyun, Syria.

On 6 October 2020, two Russian Su-34s conducted air strikes against underground structures in the Eastern bank of Euphrates, Deir Ez-Zor province allegedly inside Rojava territory resulting in the death of ISIL field commander Abu Qatada, who was involved in preparing a terrorist attack against Russian forces which resulted in the death of Major General Vyacheslav Gladkikh. Additionally, the strike also destroyed two underground shelters and killed some 30 militants.

2022 Russian invasion of Ukraine

On 28 February 2022, footage emerged reportedly showing Su-34s overflying the Kharkiv region of Ukraine. In various regions of Ukraine, downed Su-34 aircraft were mostly shot down by Ukrainian forces but some crashed for other reasons. One Su-34 was in a flat spin before it crashed. Another was a modernized variant Su-34M and was reportedly shot down by Russian forces. There were reports of pilots ejecting with some dying and some captured. Most of the downed planes were identified by their red tail numbers and registration numbers, for example, Red 31 with RF-81251.

As of 8 March 2023 there have been 19 visually confirmed cases of Su-34s being  lost, damaged or abandoned by Russian forces since the start of the 2022 Russian invasion of Ukraine. 

A lack of guided bombs required the Su-34s to fly low for accurate bombing, where they were subjected to heavy Ukrainian air-defenses. 

The first Su-34 shot down during combat occurred a few days after the beginning of the war on 28 February 2022, near Buzova airfield. Other Su-34 aircraft crashes occurred early March, 5 March, and another the same day, 6 March, 14 March, 25 April, 26 April, 18 July, 11 September, 24 September and 17 October. Russia confirmed the loss of more than 10 Su-34s. It was reported on 3 March 2023 that a Su-34 was shot down over Yenakijeve, Donetsk Oblast.

Other usage
Sukhoi Su-34s were used on bombing runs against ice dams on the rivers in Vologda Oblast to prevent the floods during the spring of 2016.

Algeria
In January 2016, Algeria was negotiating a purchase of 12 aircraft for its Air Force. The deal should have been signed in late 2016, but in 2017 the talks were still ongoing and no sale was made. On 27 December 2019, Algeria reportedly signed a contract for 14 aircraft as part of large military deal that also includes purchase of Su-35 and Su-57 fighters. However, neither Russian nor Algerian governments ever confirmed that such deal exists.

According to Mil.press, after eight years of fruitless negotiations with Algeria on selling Su-32 (export version), in 2019 Russia agreed to sell the modernized, non-downgraded Su-34ME version; Algeria became interested in the model after the campaign in Syria, where the aircraft demonstrated excellent combat qualities. Production of the first batch was underway as of March 2021 and, according to CAWAT, should be ready in 2021. Training of Algerian pilots would commence in 2022, and all planes would be delivered by 2023.

Variants
 Su-34 – basic aircraft model.
 Su-32 – export model, offered to Algeria in 2012.
 Su-34M / Su-34 NVO – modernized version. Russian contract was to be signed in 2021 and replace basic Su-34 in production. According to reports, this upgrade will seriously affect almost all of the aircraft's avionics. The radar, sight, and communication systems will be improved. The range of guided munitions that the bomber can use will be significantly expanded. EW capabilities will also be expanded with introduction of new hardpoints.

Operators
 
 Russian Air Force – 7 prototypes and 146 operational aircraft as of December 2022.
 47th Bomber Aviation Regiment – Baltimor Air Base, Voronezh Oblast
 277th Bomber Aviation Regiment – Khurba Air Base, Khabarovsk Krai
 559th Bomber Aviation Regiment – Morozovsk Air Base, Rostov Oblast
 2nd Guards Bomber Aviation Regiment – Chelyabinsk Shagol Airport, Chelyabinsk Oblast
 4th Centre for Combat Employment and Retraining of Personnel – Lipetsk Air Base, Lipetsk Oblast
 State Flight Testing Center named after V.P. Chkalov – Akhtubinsk Air Base, Astrakhan Oblast
 Khmeimim Air Base, Latakia, Syria

Specifications (Su-34)

Notable accidents 
On 17 October 2022, a Russian Su-34 fighter-bomber crashed into a residential building in the Russian city of Yeysk, killing 15 people on the ground. The pilots ejected.

See also

References

Bibliography

External links

 Official Sukhoi Su-34 webpage at 
 Su-32 page on Rosoboronexport's site

Aircraft first flown in 1990
Su-34
1990s Soviet and Russian attack aircraft
Canard aircraft
Twinjets
Twin-tail aircraft
Three-surface aircraft